Warren Franklin is an American visual effects manager, supervisor and producer who is credited on multiple features and TV series.

Warren launched his career on features like The Empire Strikes Back, and Raiders of the Lost Ark. Warren worked on feature films with directors Steven Spielberg, George Lucas, and others before becoming general manager at Industrial Light & Magic in 1984. Warren helped manage a variety of big budget feature productions at ILM over the next 15 years.

Warren's vfx credits include E.T. the Extra-Terrestrial, Indiana Jones and the Temple of Doom, The Witches of Eastwick, Who Framed Roger Rabbit, and others.

Presently Warren is Executive Producer and CEO at Rainmaker Entertainment, a visual effects and long form CG animation company based in Vancouver, British Columbia, Canada.

Filmography

Source: IMDb

References

External links
 

Visual effects artists
American chief executives
Living people
Year of birth missing (living people)